Lt. The Hon. Edward Wyndham Tennant (1 July 1897 – 22 September 1916) was an English war poet, killed at the Battle of the Somme.

Early life
He was the son of Edward Tennant, who became Lord Glenconner in 1911, and Pamela Wyndham, a writer, Lady Glenconner and later wife of Edward Grey, 1st Viscount Grey of Fallodon.  His younger brothers were the eccentric Stephen Tennant and David Tennant, the founder of the Gargoyle Club.

Born at Stockton House, Stockton, Wiltshire, which his father had just leased from Major-General A. G. Yeatman-Biggs, Tennant was educated at Winchester College. At the age of seventeen he left school and joined the Grenadier Guards in the early weeks of the First World War.

Tennant was known to friends and family as Bim, but the origin of this nickname is unknown. It has been suggested that he was engaged before his death to Nancy Cunard, but a reliable source, Colin Tennant, 3rd Baron Glenconner, responded in a letter to a question on this point and stated that the suggestion was incorrect; and Lois Gordon, Nancy Cunard's biographer, in her extensive research, never came across any hint of such an alliance.

Death and memorial
Tennant is buried at Guillemont in France at the Guillemont Road Cemetery, close to the remains of his friend Raymond Asquith, who was killed the week before. The inscription on his gravestone reads: KILLED IN ACTION IN HIS TWENTIETH YEAR.

A memorial to Tennant, sculpted by Allan G. Wyon, was erected in Salisbury Cathedral. There are two inscriptions on the memorial, one above the low-relief portrait of Tennant, and one below. The upper inscription reads: "When things were at their worst he would go up and down in the trenches cheering the men, when danger was greatest his smile was loveliest."

The inscription below the portrait has the following wording:

Works
Verses by A Child (private printing, 1909)
Worple Flit and other poems (printed posthumously, 1916)

References 
Pamela Glenconner, Edward Wyndham Tennant: a memoir by his mother Pamela Glenconner with portraits in photogravure (1919) 
 Anne Powell, Bim. A tribute to the honorable Edward Wyndham Tennant, Lieutenant, 4th Battalion Grenadier Guards 1897-1916 (1990)

External links 

Edward Wyndham Tennant at Find a Grave.
Edward Wyndham Tennant – A Memoir by his mother Pamela Glenconner at OpenLibrary.org. With a photo of E. W. Tennant on page 171.
 

20th-century English poets
1897 births
1916 deaths
Grenadier Guards officers
Military personnel from Wiltshire
British Army personnel of World War I
British military personnel killed in the Battle of the Somme
People educated at West Downs School
People educated at Winchester College
English World War I poets
20th-century English male writers
English male poets
Edward Wyndham